Thomas Heslin (April 17, 1847 – February 22, 1911) was an Irish-born prelate of the Roman Catholic Church who served as bishop of the Diocese of Natchez in Mississippi from 1889 until his death in 1911.

Biography

Early life 
One of seven children, Thomas Heslin was born on April 17, 1847, in Killoe, County Longford, to Patrick and Catherine (née Hughes) Heslin. Upon the completion of his classical studies in Granard, Ireland, he came to the United States at the invitation of Archbishop Jean-Marie Odin in 1863. Heslin then studied theology and philosophy under the Lazarists at diocesan seminary of New Orleans. Too young to receive ordination, he taught at Jefferson College for several years.

Priesthood 
Heslin was ordained to the priesthood for the Diocese of St. Louis by Bishop John Quinlan on September 8, 1869. He then served as a curate at the Cathedral of St. Louis for a month, when he was transferred to St. Vincent de Paul Church and later to St. Patrick's Church. From 1874 to 1889, he was pastor of St. Michael's Church in New Orleans.

Bishop of Natchez 
On March 29, 1889, Heslin was appointed the fifth Bishop of the Diocese of Natchez by Pope Leo XIII. He received his episcopal consecration on June 18, 1889, from Archbishop Francis Janssens, with Bishops Edward Fitzgerald and Anthony Durier serving as co-consecrators. Thomas Heslin died in Natchez, Mississippi, on February 22, 1911, at age 65.

References

1847 births
1911 deaths
19th-century Roman Catholic bishops in the United States
Irish emigrants to the United States (before 1923)
Irish expatriate Catholic bishops
Jefferson College (Mississippi) faculty
People from County Longford
Roman Catholic bishops in Mississippi
Roman Catholic Diocese of Jackson
20th-century Roman Catholic bishops in the United States